"Numbers on the Boards" is a song by American rapper Pusha T from his debut studio album My Name Is My Name (2013). It was produced by Don Cannon, Kanye West and 88-Keys. On May 10, 2013, the song was officially released as the album's second official single by GOOD Music and Def Jam Recordings.

The song received critical acclaim from music critics. On April 29, 2013 Rolling Stone gave the song "Numbers on the Boards" 4 out of 5 stars, stating "The star is Kanye West's beat, a contusive bass blur with percussion that's like bamboo sticks on a busted radiator. The result is near-perfect no-bullshit hip-hop." On May 9, 2013, the music video was released for "Numbers on the Boards" which featured cameo appearances from Kanye West and Chief Keef.

The video was shot in Paris. The Kanye West and Don Cannon-produced song was then released as the album's second single the following day. Crack Magazine named it the 11th best song of the 2010s decade.

Charts

References

2013 songs
2013 singles
Pusha T songs
Song recordings produced by Kanye West
Songs written by Jay-Z
Songs written by Kanye West
GOOD Music singles
Def Jam Recordings singles
Songs written by Pusha T